Sultan Hassan V Sri raadha Aanandha Maha Radhun was the sultan of the sultanate of Maldives. He ascended to the lion throne of Maldives after the death of his father, Omar II of the Maldives in 1484. His rule was short and ended upon his death in 1485.

See also
History of the Maldives

1485 deaths
Year of birth unknown
15th-century sultans of the Maldives